Defeasible may refer to:

Defeasibility (linguistics), the ability of an implicature or presupposition to be cancelled
Defeasible reasoning, a type of convincing but not demonstrative philosophical reasoning
Defeasible logic, a non-monotonic logic to formalize defeasible reasoning
Defeasible estate, an estate created when a grantor transfers land conditionally